The Grange is a gothic regency manor house in Stoke d'Abernon, Surrey that dates back to the 15th Century. It was part of the Eastwick Manor estate  and is close to Slyfield House  that also was part of the same estate. It was acquired in 1780 by Samuel Castle who over a number of years transformed the house into a substantial four-bay house retaining the cottage chimney. The gothic regency style is similar to that seen at Strawberry Hill House in nearby twickenham.

The house was briefly called the Grange in the 1950s according to the note 'Over the bridge to Bookham' in the St Mary's Parish Magazine of 1952, by the historian T. E. C. Walker in which he described a local walk "Bending back to Stoke we come to the Grange, formerly Bookham Lodge, Byant's Farm and Fryse Hill. It may go back as an inhabited site to about 1340 and though modernised retains early work". It was renamed the Grange in 2018 after being called Bookham Lodge for many years

Writing in St Mary's Parish Magazine of June 1952, the then rector, John Waterson, said:"The Reverend Frederick Parr Phillips purchased practically the whole parish of Stoke D'Abernon in 1852, including the Grange (Fanny Burney's old house) and also became Rector in 1862 having already been in charge of the church for nearly ten years".In 1854, Bookham Lodge was acquired by Frances, Viscountess Chewton, niece of Frances Lady Waldergrave and Lady of the Bedchamber to Queen Victoria from 1855 to 1901. She lived at Bookham lodge for almost 50 years before dying there in April 1902. Viscountess Chewton's name is perpetuated in the Lady Chewton Wood to the south of Bookham Lodge. In 1931 the freehold was sold to Sir Edmund and Lady Wyldbore-Smith. Sir Edmund Wyldbore-Smith was the British chargé d'affaires in Tangier at the time of the Perdicaris incident.

References

External links
Together Parish Magazine - St Mary's Church

Manor houses in England
Houses in Surrey